S. asiaticus may refer to:
 Silometopoides asiaticus, a spider species in the genus Silometopoides
 Struthio asiaticus, an extinct bird species
 Stylodrilus asiaticus, a worm species in the genus Stylodrilus

See also
 Asiaticus (disambiguation)